Diplocentridae is a family of scorpions. The roughly 120 species are mostly native to the New World, except for genus Nebo, which is distributed in the Middle East.

A 2003 study suggests that this family is better treated as a subfamily of the Scorpionidae.

Taxa include:
 Subfamily Diplocentrinae Karsch, 1880
 Bioculus Stahnke, 1968 
 Cazierius Francke, 1978 
 Didymocentrus Kraepelin, 1905
 Diplocentrus Peters, 1861 
 Heteronebo Pocock, 1899
 Kolotl Santibáñez-López, et al., 2014
 Oiclus Simon, 1880
 Tarsoporosus Francke, 1978
 Subfamily Nebinae Kraepelin, 1905
 Nebo Simon, 1878

References

External links
 Biolib
 Diplocentridae. Tree of Life.

 
Scorpion families